Archaeology of a Woman is a 2012 American mystery film written and directed by Sharon Greytak and starring Sally Kirkland and Victoria Clark.

Premise
A talented chef (Kate) travels from New York City to her suburban hometown to care for her mother's worsening dementia. Kate expects to put a few services in place and return to the city, but events change as her spirited mother disappears, defies authorities, and finds herself tangled up with lovers and a generation-old murder case. A unique take on dementia and mystery.

References

External links

2012 films
2012 independent films
2010s mystery films
American independent films
American mystery films
2010s English-language films
2010s American films